Smile! is a children's book by Geraldine McCaughrean. In 2004 it won the Nestlé Smarties Book Prize Bronze Award. It is about a photographer stranded in the wilderness with only ten shots left on his Polaroid camera.

References

2004 British novels
2004 children's books
British children's novels